Radek Beinhauer (born 27 September 1969) is a Czech swimmer. He competed at the 1988 Summer Olympics and the 1992 Summer Olympics.

References

External links
 

1969 births
Living people
Czech male swimmers
Olympic swimmers of Czechoslovakia
Swimmers at the 1988 Summer Olympics
Swimmers at the 1992 Summer Olympics
People from Znojmo
Sportspeople from the South Moravian Region